USS Caprice has been the name of more than one United States Navy ship, and may refer to:

, a patrol vessel in commission from 1917 to 1919
USS Caprice (PG-90), a patrol boat transferred to the British Royal Navy upon completion in 1943 and renamed 

United States Navy ship names